Graphtec Corporation, formerly Watanabe Instruments, is a company for computer input and output devices in Japan. It has subsidiaries in the USA, Europe and Australia. Graphtec was established in 1949; their first plotter was released in 1961.

Products
Pen plotter
WX4633, WX4638, WX4671, WX4675, WX4731
MP1000
Cutting plotter
Craft ROBO, Craft ROBO Pro
CE 3000
CE 5000

Driver
The plotters use Graphtec Plotter Graphic Language (GP-GL) which is not compatible with HP-GL, see its EAGLE definition:
[WX4671]

Type     = PenPlotter
Long     = "Watanabe WX4671 plotter"
Init     = ""
Reset    = "M0,0\n"
Width    = 16
Height   = 11
ResX     = 254
ResY     = 254
Move     = "M%d,%d\n"
Draw     = "D%d,%d\n"

External links
 
Graphtec America, Inc.
The GP-GL Command List (PDF)

Electronics companies of Japan
Computer printer companies
Manufacturing companies based in Tokyo
Electronics companies established in 1949
1949 establishments in Japan
Japanese brands
Companies formerly listed on the Tokyo Stock Exchange